Tardigrades, known colloquially as water bears or moss piglets, are a phylum of eight-legged segmented micro-animals. They were first described by the German zoologist Johann August Ephraim Goeze in 1773, who called them Kleiner Wasserbär ("little water bear"). In 1777, the Italian biologist Lazzaro Spallanzani named them Tardigrada, which means "slow steppers".

They have been found in diverse regions of Earth's biospheremountaintops, the deep sea, tropical rainforests, and the Antarctic. Tardigrades are among the most resilient animals known, with individual species able to survive extreme conditions – such as exposure to extreme temperatures, extreme pressures (both high and low), air deprivation, radiation, dehydration, and starvation – that would quickly kill most other known forms of life. Tardigrades have survived exposure to outer space. There are about 1,300 known species in the phylum Tardigrada, a part of the superphylum Ecdysozoa consisting of animals that grow by ecdysis such as arthropods and nematodes. The earliest known true members of the group are known from Cretaceous (145 to 66 million years ago) amber, found in North America, but are essentially modern forms, and therefore likely have a significantly earlier origin, as they diverged from their closest relatives in the Cambrian, over 500 million years ago.

They are short and plump, with four pairs of legs, each ending in claws (usually four to eight) or suction disks. Tardigrades are prevalent in mosses and lichens and feed on plant cells, algae, and small invertebrates. When collected, they may be viewed under a low-power microscope, making them accessible to students and amateur scientists.

Naming 

Johann August Ephraim Goeze originally named the tardigrade Kleiner Wasserbär, meaning "little water-bear" in German (today, they are often referred to in German as Bärtierchen or "little bear-animal"). The name "water-bear" comes from the way they walk, reminiscent of a bear's gait. The name Tardigradum means "slow walker" and was given by Lazzaro Spallanzani in 1777.

Description 

For comparison, grass pollen is typically .

Habitat 
Tardigrades are often found on lichens and mosses, for example by soaking a piece of moss in water. Other environments in which they are found include dunes and coasts generally, soil, leaf litter, and marine or freshwater sediments, where they may occur quite frequently, up to 25,000 animals per litre (95,000 animals per gallon). One tardigrade, Echiniscoides wyethi, may be found on barnacles.

Anatomy and morphology 
Tardigrades have barrel-shaped bodies with four pairs of stubby legs. The body consists of a head, three body segments each with a pair of legs, and a caudal segment with a fourth pair of legs. The legs are without joints, while the feet have four to eight claws each. The cuticle contains chitin and protein and is moulted periodically. The first three pairs of legs are directed downward along the sides and are the primary means of locomotion, while the fourth pair is directed backward on the last segment of the trunk and is used primarily for grasping the substrate.

Tardigrades lack several Hox genes and a large intermediate region of the body axis. In insects, this corresponds to the entire thorax and the abdomen. Practically the whole body, except for the last pair of legs, is made up of just the segments that are homologous to the head region in arthropods.

All adult tardigrades of the same species have the same number of cells (see eutely). Some species have as many as 40,000 cells in each adult, while others have far fewer.

The body cavity consists of a haemocoel, but the only place where a true coelom can be found is around the gonad. No respiratory organs are found, with gas exchange able to occur across the entirety of the body. Some tardigrades have three tubular glands associated with the rectum; these may be excretory organs similar to the Malpighian tubules of arthropods, although the details remain unclear. Also, nephridia are absent.

The tubular mouth is armed with stylets, which are used to pierce the plant cells, algae, or small invertebrates on which the tardigrades feed, releasing the body fluids or cell contents. The mouth opens into a triradiate, muscular, sucking pharynx. The stylets are lost when the animal molts, and a new pair is secreted from a pair of glands that lie on either side of the mouth. The pharynx connects to a short esophagus, and then to an intestine that occupies much of the length of the body, which is the main site of digestion. The intestine opens, via a short rectum, to an anus located at the terminal end of the body. Some species only defecate when they molt, leaving the feces behind with the shed cuticle.

The brain develops in a bilaterally symmetric pattern. Tardigrades have a dorsal brain atop a paired ventral nervous system. The brain includes multiple lobes, mostly consisting of three bilaterally paired clusters of neurons. The brain is attached to a large ganglion below the esophagus, from which a double ventral nerve cord runs the length of the body. The cord possesses one ganglion per segment, each of which produces lateral nerve fibres that run into the limbs. Many species possess a pair of rhabdomeric pigment-cup eyes, and numerous sensory bristles are on the head and body.

Tardigrades all possess a buccopharyngeal apparatus (swallowing device made of muscles and spines that activates an inner jaw and begins digestion and movement along the throat and intestine) which, along with the claws, is used to differentiate species.

Reproduction 

Although some species are parthenogenic, both males and females are usually present, although females are frequently larger and more common. Both sexes have a single gonad located above the intestine. Two ducts run from the testes in males, opening through a single pore in front of the anus. In contrast, females have a single duct opening either just above the anus or directly into the rectum, which forms a cloaca.

Tardigrades are oviparous, and fertilization is usually external. Mating occurs during the molt with the eggs being laid inside the shed cuticle of the female and then covered with sperm. A few species have internal fertilization, with mating occurring before the female fully sheds her cuticle. In most cases, the eggs are left inside the shed cuticle to develop, but some species attach them to nearby substrate.

The eggs hatch after no more than 14 days, with the young already possessing their full complement of adult cells. Growth to the adult size occurs by enlargement of the individual cells (hypertrophy), rather than by cell division. Tardigrades may molt up to 12 times.

Tardigrades tend to court before mating. Courtship is an early step in mating and was first observed in tardigrades in 1895. Research shows that up to nine males aggregate around a female to mate.

Ecology and life history 

Most tardigrades are phytophagous (plant eaters) or bacteriophagous (bacteria eaters), but some are carnivorous to the extent that they eat smaller species of tardigrades (e.g., Milnesium tardigradum).

Tardigrades share morphological characteristics with many species that differ largely by class. Biologists have a difficult time finding verification among tardigrade species because of this relationship. These animals are most closely related to the early evolution of arthropods. Tardigrade fossils go as far back as the Cretaceous period in North America. Tardigrades are considered cosmopolitan and can be located in regions all over the world. The eggs and cysts of tardigrades are so durable that they can be carried great distances on the feet of other animals.

Tardigrades have survived all five recognized mass extinctions due to their plethora of survival characteristics, including the ability to survive conditions that would be fatal to almost all other animals (see the next section).

The lifespan of tardigrades ranges from three to four months for some species, up to two years for other species, not counting their time in dormant states.

Physiology 

Scientists have reported tardigrades in hot springs, on top of the Himalayas (above sea level) to the deep sea and from the polar regions to the equator, under layers of solid ice, and in ocean sediments. Many species can be found in milder environments such as lakes, ponds, and meadows, while others can be found in stone walls and roofs. Tardigrades are most common in moist environments, but can stay active wherever they can retain at least some moisture.

Tardigrades are thought to be able to survive even complete global mass extinction events caused by astrophysical events, such as gamma-ray bursts, or large meteorite impacts. Tardigrades that live in harsh conditions undergo an annual process of cyclomorphosis, allowing for survival in subzero temperatures.

They are not considered extremophilic because they are not adapted to exploit these conditions, only to endure them. This means that their chances of dying increase the longer they are exposed to the extreme environments, whereas true extremophiles thrive in a physically or geochemically extreme environment that would harm most other organisms.

Tardigrades are one of the few groups of species that are capable of suspending their metabolism (see cryptobiosis). While in this state, their metabolism lowers to less than 0.01% of normal and their water content can drop to 1% of normal, and they can go without food or water for more than 30 years, only to later rehydrate, forage, and reproduce. Many species of tardigrade can survive in a dehydrated state up to five years, or longer in exceptional cases. Depending on the environment, they may enter this state via anhydrobiosis, allowing tardigrades, along with some other micro-metazoans (such as worms, rotifers, and crustaceans), protozoans and plants, that ability to survive in inhospitable habitats, as opposed to other living things. In addition to offering protection from desiccation and freezing under normal circumstances, anhydrobiosis also permits resistance to unnatural abiotic extremes such as subzero temperatures.cryobiosis, osmobiosis, or anoxybiosis.

Their ability to remain desiccated for such long periods of time was thought to be dependent on high levels of the nonreducing disaccharide trehalose, which is commonly seen in other organisms that survive desiccation, and tardigrades have trehalase genes. However, it has been seen that in both tardigrades and bdelloid rotifers, there is only a partial capability to synthesize trehalose in quantities that may contribute to desiccation tolerance.

In response to this finding, more research was done on how these animals survived such extreme conditions. It was found that intrinsically disordered proteins (IDPs) were highly expressed in response to desiccation in tardigrades. Additionally, three new IDPs were found to be specific to tardigrades and coined tardigrade specific proteins (TDPs). These TDPs may maintain the structure of membranes by associating with the polar heads of the phospholipids bilayers, avoiding structural damage upon rehydration. Also, TDPs, being highly hydrophilic, are thought to be involved in a vitrification mechanism, where a glass-like matrix forms within cells to protect the cellular contents upon desiccation. Their DNA is further protected from radiation by a protein called "dsup" (short for damage suppressor). In this cryptobiotic state, the tardigrade is known as a tun.

Tardigrades are able to survive in extreme environments that would kill almost any other animal. Extremes at which tardigrades can survive include those of:
 Temperature – tardigrades can survive:
 A few minutes at 
 30 years at 
 A few days at 
 A few minutes at 

Research published in 2020 shows that tardigrades are sensitive to high temperatures. Tardigrades in the tun state fared a bit better, tolerating higher temperatures. Longer exposure time decreased the temperature needed for lethality, though. For 24 hours of exposure,  was enough to kill half of the tun-state tardigrades.

 Pressure – they can withstand the extremely low pressure of a vacuum and also very high pressures, more than 1,200 times atmospheric pressure. Some species can also withstand pressure of 6,000 atmospheres, which is nearly six times the pressure of water in the deepest ocean trench, the Mariana Trench.
 Impacts – tardigrades can survive impacts up to about 900 meters per second, and momentary shock pressures up to about 1.14 gigapascals.
 Dehydration – the longest that living tardigrades have been shown to survive in a dry state is nearly 10 years, although there is one report of leg movement, not generally considered "survival", in a 120-year-old specimen from dried moss. When exposed to extremely low temperatures, their body composition goes from 85% water to only 3%. Because water expands upon freezing, dehydration ensures the tardigrades' tissues are not ruptured by the expansion of freezing ice.
 Radiation – tardigrades can withstand 1,000 times more radiation than other animals, median lethal doses of 5,000 Gy (of gamma rays) and 6,200 Gy (of heavy ions) in hydrated animals (5 to 10 Gy could be fatal to a human). The only explanation found in earlier experiments for this ability was that their lowered water state provides fewer reactants for ionizing radiation. However, subsequent research found that tardigrades, when hydrated, still remain highly resistant to shortwave UV radiation in comparison to other animals, and that one factor for this is their efficient ability to repair damage to their DNA resulting from that exposure.

Irradiation of tardigrade eggs collected directly from a natural substrate (moss) showed a clear dose-related response, with a steep decline in hatchability at doses up to 4 kGy, above which no eggs hatched. The eggs were more tolerant to radiation late in development. No eggs irradiated at the early developmental stage hatched, and only one egg at middle stage hatched, while eggs irradiated in the late stage hatched at a rate indistinguishable from controls.
 Environmental toxins – tardigrades are reported to undergo chemobiosis, a cryptobiotic response to high levels of environmental toxins. However, as of 2001, these laboratory results have yet to be verified.

Survival after exposure to outer space
Tardigrades are the first known animal to survive after exposure to outer space. In September 2007, dehydrated tardigrades were taken into low Earth orbit on the FOTON-M3 mission carrying the BIOPAN astrobiology payload. For 10 days, groups of tardigrades, some of them previously dehydrated, some of them not, were exposed to the hard vacuum of outer space, or vacuum and solar UV radiation. Back on Earth, more than 68% of the subjects protected from solar UV radiation were reanimated within 30 minutes following rehydration, although subsequent mortality was high; many of these produced viable embryos. In contrast, hydrated samples exposed to the combined effect of vacuum and full solar UV radiation had significantly reduced survival, with only three subjects of Milnesium tardigradum surviving. Also, it was found that the space vacuum did not have a significant effect on egg-laying in either R. coronifer or M. tardigradum. However, M. tardigradum exposed to UV radiation had a lower egg laying rate. Their conclusion was that microgravity and cosmic radiation "did not significantly affect survival of tardigrades in flight, and stated that tardigrades represent a useful animal for space research." In November 2011, they were among the organisms to be sent by the U.S.-based Planetary Society on the Russian Fobos-Grunt mission's Living Interplanetary Flight Experiment to Phobos; however, the launch failed. In August 2019, scientists reported that a capsule containing tardigrades in a cryptobiotic state may have survived for a while on the Moon after the April 2019 crash landing of Beresheet, a failed Israeli lunar lander, but in May 2021 it was reported that they were unlikely to have survived the impact.

In recent years, there has also been increased speculation regarding tardigrades' ability to survive on Mars without any life support systems, but despite the hardiness of the tardigrade, it would still "need stuff to eat," in order to set up shop.

Taxonomy 

Scientists have conducted morphological and molecular studies to understand how tardigrades relate to other lineages of ecdysozoan animals. Two plausible placements have been proposed: tardigrades are either most closely related to Arthropoda and Onychophora, or to nematodes. Evidence for the former is a common result of morphological studies; evidence of the latter is found in some molecular analyses.

The latter hypothesis has been rejected by recent microRNA and expressed sequence tag analyses. Apparently, the grouping of tardigrades with nematodes found in a number of molecular studies is a long branch attraction artifact. Within the arthropod group (called panarthropoda and comprising onychophora, tardigrades and euarthropoda), three patterns of relationship are possible: tardigrades sister to onychophora plus arthropods (the lobopodia hypothesis); onychophora sister to tardigrades plus arthropods (the tactopoda hypothesis); and onychophora sister to tardigrades. Recent analyses indicate that the panarthropoda group is monophyletic, and that tardigrades are a sister group of Antennopoda, the lineage consisting of arthropods and Onychophora.

The minute sizes of tardigrades and their membranous integuments make their fossilization both difficult to detect and highly unusual. The only known fossil specimens are those from mid-Cambrian deposits in Siberia (Orsten fauna) and a few rare specimens from Cretaceous amber.

The Siberian tardigrade fossils differ from living tardigrades in several ways. They have three pairs of legs rather than four, they have a simplified head morphology, and they have no posterior head appendages, but they share with modern tardigrades their columnar cuticle construction. Scientists think they represent a stem group of living tardigrades.

In October 2021, a new species, Paradoryphoribius chronocaribbeus, was discovered as a fossil in amber that was dated to be 16 million years old.

Evolutionary history 

There are multiple lines of evidence that tardigrades are secondarily miniaturized from a larger ancestor, probably a lobopodian and perhaps resembling Aysheaia, which many analyses place close to the divergence of the tardigrade lineage. An alternative hypothesis derives tactopoda from a clade encompassing dinocaridids and Opabinia.

The oldest remains of modern tardigrades are those of Milnesium swolenskyi, belonging to the living genus Milnesium known from a Late Cretaceous (Turonian) aged specimen of New Jersey amber, around 90 million years old. Another fossil, Beorn leggi, is known from a Late Campanian (~72 million years old) specimen of Canadian amber and has been placed in its own family (Beornidae), but was subsequently suggested to belong to the Hypsibiidae. An indeterminate heterotardigrade was also noted from the same deposit.

Genomes and genome sequencing 
Tardigrade genomes vary in size, from about 75 to 800 megabase pairs of DNA. Hypsibius exemplaris (formerly Hypsibius dujardini) has a compact genome of 100 megabase pairs and a generation time of about two weeks; it can be cultured indefinitely and cryopreserved.

The genome of Ramazzottius varieornatus, one of the most stress-tolerant species of tardigrades, was sequenced by a team of researchers from the University of Tokyo in 2015. While previous research had claimed that around one-sixth of the genome had been acquired from other organisms, it is now known that less than 1.2% of its genes were the result of horizontal gene transfer. They also found evidence of a loss of gene pathways that are known to promote damage due to stress. This study also found a high expression of novel tardigrade-unique proteins, including Damage suppressor (Dsup), which was shown to protect against DNA damage from X-ray radiation. The same team applied the Dsup protein to human cultured cells and found that it suppressed X-ray damage to the human cells by around 40%. While the exact mechanism of DNA protection is largely unknown, the results from an August 2020 study suggest that strong electrostatic attractions along with high protein flexibility help form a molecular aggregate, which allows Dsup to shield DNA.

Ecological importance 
Many organisms that live in aquatic environments feed on species such as nematodes, tardigrades, bacteria, algae, mites, and collembolans. Tardigrades work as pioneer species by inhabiting new developing environments. This movement attracts other invertebrates to populate that space, while also attracting predators.

In popular culture 

 When the characters in the superhero films Ant-Man (2015) and Ant-Man and the Wasp (2018) shrink themselves to enter the "Quantum Realm", they encounter tardigrades.
 In the 2015 sci-fi horror film Harbinger Down, the characters have to deal with deadly mutated tardigrades.
 The second arc of the comic book Paper Girls (2015) features a pair of tardigrades that have been enlarged to a massive size as a side effect of time travel.
 Musician Cosmo Sheldrake imagines himself a tardigrade in his 2015 "Tardigrade Song".
 In Star Trek: Discovery (2017), the alien "Ripper" creature who is used to "navigate" through a galactic mycelium network and instantly move the ship from one location in the galaxy to another is referred to as a "giant space tardigrade" and said to be a cousin of the tardigrade.
 The 2017 South Park episode "Moss Piglets" involves a science experiment in which tardigrades learn to dance to the music of Taylor Swift.
 The 2018 Family Guy episode "Big Trouble in Little Quahog" features Stewie and Brian being shrunk to a microscopic level, during which they meet a group of friendly tardigrades or "water bears" who help them.
 The plot in the 2021 Sam & Max: This Time It's Virtual video game includes an abandoned tardigrade amusement park, "Cap'N Aquabear's Funtime Park".

See also 
 List of tardigrades of South Africa
 List of microorganisms tested in outer space
 Living Interplanetary Flight Experiment, study of selected microorganisms in outer space
 Panspermia

References

External links 

 Tardigrada Register 

 
Extant Cambrian first appearances
Polyextremophiles
Psychrophiles
Radiodurants
Space-flown life
Thermophiles
Xerophiles
Tactopoda